Old-Timey Concert is the title of a live recording by American folk music artist Doc Watson, Clint Howard and Fred Price. Originally a "Double LP", now one CD with four tracks omitted: Tracks 8, 15, 16 and 19.Recorded in 1967 for the Seattle Folklore Society.

Track listing
 "Introduction" –  0:59
 "New River Train" (Traditional; arranged and adapted by Doc Watson) – 3:01
 "What Does the Deep Sea Say" (Monroe Brothers) – 3:41
 "Sunny Tennessee" (arranged and adapted by Doc Watson) – 3:43
 "Walkin' in Jerusalem" (arranged and adapted by Doc Watson) – 2:09
 "Sitting on Top of the World" (Sam Chatmon, Walter Vinson) – 3:33
 "Pretty Little Pink" (Traditional; arranged and adapted by Doc Watson) – 1:58
 "Sears-Roebuck Routine" (Story) - 1:30 (not on the CD)
 "My Home's Across the Blue Ridge Mountains" (Clarence "Tom" Ashley, A. P. Carter) – 3:21
 "Slew Foot" (Porter Wagoner, George Flower) – 2:36
 "Little Orphan Girl" (Traditional; arranged and adapted by Doc Watson) – 3:14
 "Long Journey Home" (arranged and adapted by Doc Watson) – 2:37
 "Rank Stranger" (Traditional; arranged and adapted by Doc Watson) – 2:56
 "Crawdad" (arranged and adapted by Doc Watson) – 3:55
 "There's More Pretty Girls Than One" (Fiddlin' Arthur Smith, Alton Delmore) - 2:48 (not on the CD)
 "My Mama's Gone (Gambler's Yodel)" (Alton Delmore) - 2:38 (not on the CD)
 "Fire on the Mountain" (Traditional; arranged and adapted by Doc Watson) – 2:45
 "East Bound Train" (arranged and adapted by Doc Watson) – 3:34
 "Reuben's Train" (arranged and adapted by Doc Watson) - 2:41 (not on the CD)
 "On the Banks of the Old Tennessee" (G. B. Grayson) – 3:30
 "Mountain Dew" (Bascom Lamar Lunsford, "Mac" Scott Wiseman) – 3:58
 "Corrina, Corrina" (Traditional; arranged and adapted by Doc Watson) – 2:31
 "Footprints in the Snow" (Traditional; adapted by the Monroe Brothers) – 4:03
 "I Saw a Man at the Close of Day" (G. B. Grayson, Henry Whitter) – 3:11
 "Cackling Hen" (Traditional; arranged and adapted by Doc Watson) – 1:41
 "Wanted Man" (Bob Hilliard, "Al" Lee Pockriss) – 2:17
 "Way Downtown" (Traditional; arranged and adapted by Doc Watson) – 2:27
 "Will the Circle Be Unbroken" (Traditional; arranged and adapted by Doc Watson) – 4:13

Personnel
Doc Watson – guitar, harmonica, mandolin, banjo, vocals
Clint Howard – guitar, vocals
Fred Price – fiddle, vocals
Production notes
Fritz Richmond – engineer
Phil Williams – engineer
Mark Barry – mixing

References

1967 live albums
Doc Watson live albums
Vanguard Records live albums